The 1977 Boston Red Sox season was the 77th season in the franchise's Major League Baseball history. The Red Sox finished tied for second in the American League East with a record of 97 wins and 64 losses,  games behind the New York Yankees.

Offseason 
 November 22, 1976: Darryl Cias was signed as a free agent by the Red Sox.

Regular season 

Boston's final game of the season, scheduled for October 2 at home against the Baltimore Orioles, was rained out and not rescheduled.

Highlights
Lack of pitching depth might have been a hindrance, but the team was helped by a league-leading offense, which during one ten-game span hit 33 home runs. With that kind of scoring, Boston managed to compete with the Yankees and Orioles—leading the division as late as August 22—but at season's end, not even 97 wins would be enough.

On June 18, during a nationally televised game against the New York Yankees at Fenway Park in Boston, Jim Rice, a powerful hitter but a slow runner, hit a ball into right field.  Yankees outfielder Reggie Jackson seemed to approach the ball indifferently, and Rice reached second base. Furious, Yankees manager Billy Martin removed Jackson from the game without even waiting for the end of the inning, sending Paul Blair out to replace him. When Jackson arrived at the dugout, Martin yelled that Jackson had shown him up. They argued, and Jackson said that Martin's heavy drinking had impaired his judgment. Despite Jackson being 18 years younger, about  taller and maybe  heavier, Martin lunged at him, and had to be restrained by coaches Yogi Berra and Elston Howard. Red Sox fans could see this in the dugout and began cheering wildly, and the NBC television cameras showed the confrontation to the entire country. The Red Sox went on to win the game, 10–4.

Season standings

Record vs. opponents

Notable transactions 
 April 5, 1977: Darryl Cias was released by the Red Sox.
 May 28, 1977: Bobby Darwin was traded by the Red Sox to the Chicago Cubs for Ramón Hernández.
 June 7, 1977: Pete Ladd was drafted by the Red Sox in the 25th round of the 1977 Major League Baseball Draft.
 August 20, 1977: Ramón Hernández was released by the Red Sox.

Opening Day lineup 

Source:

Roster

Player stats

Batting

Starters by position 
Note: Pos = Position; G = Games played; AB = At bats; H = Hits; Avg. = Batting average; HR = Home runs; RBI = Runs batted in

Other batters 
Note: G = Games played; AB = At bats; H = Hits; Avg. = Batting average; HR = Home runs; RBI = Runs batted in

Pitching

Starting pitchers 
Note: G = Games pitched; IP = Innings pitched; W = Wins; L = Losses; ERA = Earned run average; SO = Strikeouts

Other pitchers 
Note: G = Games pitched; IP = Innings pitched; W = Wins; L = Losses; ERA = Earned run average; SO = Strikeouts

Relief pitchers 
Note: G = Games pitched; W = Wins; L = Losses; SV = Saves; ERA = Earned run average; SO = Strikeouts

Awards and honors 
 Jim Rice – AL Player of the Month (July)
 Carl Yastrzemski, Gold Glove Award (OF)

All-Star Game
 Rick Burleson, starting SS
 Bill Campbell, reserve P
 Carlton Fisk, starting C
 Fred Lynn, reserve OF
 Jim Rice, reserve OF
 George Scott, reserve 1B
 Carl Yastrzemski, starting CF

Farm system 

Source:

References

Further reading

External links 
1977 Boston Red Sox team page at Baseball Reference
1977 Boston Red Sox season at baseball-almanac.com

Boston Red Sox seasons
Boston Red Sox
Boston Red Sox
Red Sox